Amy Ellen Jones is an English cricketer who plays as a wicket-keeper and right-handed batter for Warwickshire, Central Sparks, Birmingham Phoenix and England. She made her England debut in 2013 and is a holder of an ECB central contract.

On 8 September 2022, England's captain Nat Sciver announced that she decided to withdraw from their home white ball series against India "to focus on her mental health and well being". In her absence, Jones was named as England's captain for the WT20I and WODI series.

Early life and career
Jones was born in Solihull, West Midlands, and raised in nearby Sutton Coldfield, where she attended John Willmott School. Her first experience of organised sport was playing on a boys' football team for Aston Villa; she then joined Walmley Cricket Club and rose rapidly through the ranks. She has since commented:

While still in her mid-teens, Jones represented the Warwickshire Academy and began to be selected for England Development and Academy programmes. In 2011, when she was 18, she was called up to the England Women's Academy at Loughborough University. By then, she was an accomplished wicket-keeper, and had already had her keeping assessed on occasional training sessions at the academy. Soon after her callup, she was informed she was to become a full-time member of the academy and deputy to then regular England team wicket-keeper Sarah Taylor.

Career
Jones was the holder of one of the first tranche of 18 ECB central contracts for women players, which were announced in April 2014. In April 2015, Jones was named as one of the England women's Academy squad tour to Dubai, where England women played their Australian counterparts in two 50-over games, and two Twenty20 matches.  A member of the 2015 Women's Ashes squad, she played in the one-day matches but was replaced in the squad by Fran Wilson.

In October 2018, she was named in England's squad for the 2018 ICC Women's World Twenty20 tournament in the West Indies. In November 2018, she was named in the Perth Scorchers' squad for the 2018–19 Women's Big Bash League season.

In February 2019, she was awarded a full central contract by the England and Wales Cricket Board (ECB) for 2019.

In June 2019, the ECB named her in England's squad for their opening match against Australia to contest the Women's Ashes. The following month, she was also named in England's Test squad for the one-off match against Australia. She made her Test debut for England against Australia women on 18 July 2019.

Upon the retirement of Sarah Taylor in late 2019, Jones became the first choice wicket-keeper for the England team. By then, she had already  kept wicket in 42 of her 80 England matches across all formats. In January 2020, she was named in England's squad for the 2020 ICC Women's T20 World Cup in Australia.

On 18 June 2020, Jones was named in a squad of 24 players to begin training ahead of international women's fixtures starting in England following the COVID-19 pandemic. She featured in all five matches, making a match best score of 55 in the fourth T20I.

In June 2021, Jones was named in England's Test squad for their one-off match against India. In December 2021, Jones was named in England's squad for their tour to Australia to contest the Women's Ashes. In February 2022, she was named in England's team for the 2022 Women's Cricket World Cup in New Zealand where they finished runners up after losing to Australia.

In April 2022, she was bought by the Birmingham Phoenix for the 2022 season of The Hundred. In June 2022, she was named the 2022 Charlotte Edwards Cup Player of the Year by the PCA, scoring 289 runs in 8 games for Central Sparks, the most across the entire competition. In July 2022, she was named in England's team for the cricket tournament at the 2022 Commonwealth Games in Birmingham, England.

In September 2022, due to the absence of captain Heather Knight and vice captain Nat Sciver, Jones was made captain of England for their home white ball series against India.

Personal life
Jones is in a relationship with Piepa Cleary, a seam bowler from Australia who plays for the Perth Scorchers. In 2021, after the relationship had been a long-distance one for some years, Cleary relocated to England and started playing for North West Thunder. Jones and Cleary are now both based in Loughborough, Leicestershire.

References

External links

1993 births
Living people
Sportspeople from Solihull
England women Test cricketers
England women One Day International cricketers
England women Twenty20 International cricketers
Central Sparks cricketers
Loughborough Lightning cricketers
Perth Scorchers (WBBL) cricketers
Sydney Sixers (WBBL) cricketers
Sydney Thunder (WBBL) cricketers
Warwickshire women cricketers
Western Australia women cricketers
LGBT cricketers
Lesbian sportswomen
English LGBT sportspeople
Birmingham Phoenix cricketers
21st-century LGBT people
Wicket-keepers
Cricketers at the 2022 Commonwealth Games
Commonwealth Games competitors for England